Roger Clifford Capey (27 February 1945 – 2 March 2000) was a New Zealand field hockey player. He competed in the men's tournament at the 1968 Summer Olympics.

Capey died on 2 March 2000.

References

External links
 

1945 births
2000 deaths
New Zealand male field hockey players
Olympic field hockey players of New Zealand
Field hockey players at the 1968 Summer Olympics
Field hockey players from Whangārei